Vinagre is a village in the eastern part of the island of Brava, Cape Verde. It is situated at 200 m elevation, close to the Atlantic coast. It is about 3 kilometer east of the island capital of Nova Sintra, northwest is the small village of Santa Bárbara

There is a mineral spring in the village called nascente do Vinagre, which supplies the village Furna with drinking water.

References

Villages and settlements in Brava, Cape Verde